The House of Beaufort  is an English noble and quasi-royal family, which originated in the fourteenth century as the legitimated issue of John of Gaunt, 1st Duke of Lancaster (the third surviving son of King Edward III), whose eldest legitimate son was King Henry IV, the first Lancastrian king. The Beauforts  played an important role during the Wars of the Roses in the fifteenth century and the eventual heiress of the family Lady Margaret Beaufort was the mother of King Henry VII, the first Tudor monarch of England.

The name Beaufort refers to the estate of Montmorency-Beaufort in Champagne, France, an ancient and seemingly important possession of the House of Lancaster. It is earliest associated with Edmund Crouchback, 1st Earl of Lancaster (1245-1296) (the younger son of King Henry III) whose third son John of Lancaster (1286-1317) was called "Seigneur of Beaufort". The estate of Beaufort was eventually inherited, with other vast possessions, by John of Gaunt, 1st Duke of Lancaster (third surviving son of King Edward III) following his marriage to the heiress Blanche of Lancaster.

The Beaufort family originated in the illegitimate issue of John of Gaunt by his then-mistress Katherine Swynford. Gaunt married Swynford in 1396, as his third wife, and their children were subsequently legitimated both by his nephew King Richard II and by Pope Boniface IX. There were four children: John Beaufort, 1st Earl of Somerset (1373–1410); Cardinal Henry Beaufort, (1375–1447), Bishop of Winchester; Thomas Beaufort, Duke of Exeter (1377–1426) and Joan Beaufort, Countess of Westmorland (1379–1440). The House of Tudor was descended from the Beauforts in the female line and all subsequent English and British monarchs are descended from the first Tudor King, Henry VII.

The House of Beaufort continues to exist in a further illegitimate line, surnamed "Somerset", the senior representative of which is Henry Somerset, 12th Duke of Beaufort, who is thus a direct male-line descendant, albeit via a legitimated and an illegitimate line, of King Henry II, the first Plantagenet King of England. The present King therefore has a far more complex biological relationship to their common ancestor. However a decree of King Henry IV in 1406 barred his legitimated half-siblings and their issue from any claim to the throne and the illegitimacy of the Somerset branch doubly bars them.

History 

The Beauforts were a powerful and wealthy family from the start, and rose to greater power after their half-brother became King Henry IV in 1399, having deposed his 1st cousin King Richard II. However, in 1406, Henry IV decided that although the Beauforts were legitimate, their line could not be used to make any claim to the throne. John Beaufort had already been created Earl of Somerset in 1397. His second son John became the first Duke of Somerset in 1443.

The second son (of John of Gaunt), Henry, became a bishop, Lord Chancellor, and a Cardinal; the third son, Thomas, became Duke of Exeter; and the daughter, Joan, married Ralph Neville, 1st Earl of Westmorland, as his second wife. Joan's many descendants include the Dukes of York, Warwick the "Kingmaker", the Dukes of Norfolk, the Dukes of Buckingham, the Earls of Northumberland, and Catherine Parr, the last queen of Henry VIII.

When the dynastic struggle of the Wars of the Roses broke out in the later fifteenth century, the Beauforts were the chief supporters of Henry VI and the House of Lancaster.

Henry VII traced his claim to the English crown through his mother, Margaret Beaufort, granddaughter of John Beaufort, 1st Earl of Somerset, and great-granddaughter of John of Gaunt.

The Beauforts suffered heavily in the Wars of the Roses. Edmund Beaufort, 2nd Duke of Somerset and his three elder sons (the 3rd and 4th Dukes and the Earl of Dorset), all lost their lives, leaving no legitimate male heir. The male line was however continued through Charles Somerset, 1st Earl of Worcester, the illegitimate son of Henry Beaufort, 3rd Duke of Somerset, who adopted the surname "Somerset" and used the arms of Beaufort but with a baton sinister for bastardy.

Henry Somerset, 3rd Marquess of Worcester (1629–1700), sixth in descent from Charles Somerset, 1st Earl of Worcester, assisted in the Restoration of the Monarchy to King Charles II, who in  1682 created him Duke of Beaufort. The title Duke of Somerset was no longer available, having been granted in 1547 by King Edward VI to his uncle Edward Seymour, Lord Protector, which family and title survives today.

Thus the Beaufort family is today represented in the male line by its illegitimate continuation, the House of Somerset, whose senior representative  is Henry Somerset, 12th Duke of Beaufort. The Somerset family has long borne the arms of Beaufort undifferenced, with the baton sinister adopted by Charles Somerset, 1st Earl of Worcester, discontinued.

Notable Beauforts 

These included:

 John Beaufort, 1st Earl of Somerset (c. 1371–1410).
 Henry Beaufort, 2nd Earl of Somerset (c. 1401–1418).
 John Beaufort, 1st Duke of Somerset (c. 1404–1444).
 Margaret Beaufort, Countess of Richmond and Derby (1443–1509), mother of King Henry VII of England
 Joan Beaufort, Queen of Scotland (c. 1404–1445)
 Thomas Beaufort, Count of Perche (c. 1405–1431)
 Edmund Beaufort, 2nd Duke of Somerset (c. 1406–1455).
 Henry Beaufort, 3rd Duke of Somerset (1436–1464).
 Margaret Beaufort, Countess of Stafford (c. 1427–1474)
 Edmund Beaufort, 4th Duke of Somerset (c. 1438–1471).
 John Beaufort, Marquess of Dorset (c. 1441–1471)
 Margaret Beaufort, Countess of Devon (1409–1449)
 Henry Beaufort (c. 1375–1447), Cardinal Bishop of Winchester 
 Thomas Beaufort, Duke of Exeter (c. 1377–1426)
 Joan Beaufort, Countess of Westmorland (c. 1379–1440)
 Cecily Neville, Duchess of York (1415–1495), mother of Kings Edward IV and Richard III of England

Family tree

Coats of arms

Symbols of Beaufort

The House of Beaufort adopted various heraldic or quasi-heraldic symbols, badges or cognisances. These included:
The Beaufort Portcullis, now the symbol of the House of Commons;
The heraldic colours white and blue, an old symbol of the Earls of Lancaster, shown componée;
The Beaufort Yale, an heraldic beast used as supporters of the escutcheon;
The Forget-me-Not flower (Myosotis sylvatica), a reference to the heraldic motto of Lady Margaret Beaufort Souvent me Souvient ("I often remember"). It is visible sculpted on the main gate of St John's College, Cambridge, founded by Lady Margaret Beaufort. The forget-me-not flower was possibly first used as the heraldic badge of King Henry IV, legitimate son and heir of John of Gaunt. One of Henry IV's mottos was souveyne vous de moi, the French name for the forget-me-not flower. Henry IV's accounts contain several references to this flower, for example "for mending a collar of the lord in the form of flowers of souveyne vous de moi … with a swan newly enamelled" and "for a collar of esses and flowers of souveyne vous de moys".

References

Attribution

Bibliography
 
 
 
 
 
 

1373 establishments in England

English families